Events from the year 1447 in France

Incumbents
 Monarch – Charles VII

Events
 Unknown - Joan, daughter of Charles VII, marries John, Duke of Bourbon

Deaths
 Jenson Salvart, contractor (born 1398)

References

1440s in France